Manon Massé  (born 1963) is a Canadian politician in Quebec and one of the two current leaders for Québec solidaire since 2017. She has represented Sainte-Marie–Saint-Jacques in the National Assembly of Quebec since the 2014 general election. Before her time in political office, she was a community organizer and one of the co-founders for the political movement Option citoyenne.

Biography 
Massé was born on 22 May 1963 in Windsor, Quebec, to Fernande Migneault and Gilles Massé, both factory workers by profession. She spent the first seven years of her childhood in Windsor until her family moved to Boucherville, a suburb of Montreal.

She studied at Cégep Édouard-Montpetit before pursuing a major in theology at the Université de Montréal.

Massé worked with various community organisations, social causes, and political movements, including the Comité social Centre-Sud and Fédération des femmes du Québec (trans. Women's Federation of Québec). She was also on the coordinating committees for the Marche mondiale des Femmes in 2000 and the Marche du pain et des roses in 1995. In 2011, she was also part of the Freedom Flotilla II, representing Québec solidaire on the Canadian Boat for Gaza, Tahrir.

Political career 
Manon Massé was the first-ever candidate to stand for political office under the Québec Solidaire banner, doing so in the 2006 by-election for the Sainte-Marie–Saint-Jacques constituency she now represents. She received 22% of the vote.

She was elected to the National Assembly of Quebec in the 2014 election, her fifth attempt and winning the party its third seat.

Due to her narrow margin of victory over Quebec Liberal Party candidate Anna Klisko of 91 votes, a request for a judicial recount was filed by Klisko. The request was rejected by the presiding judge on 11 April, on the grounds that Klisko did not have sufficient evidence of any irregularities in the election process.

Party Spokesperson, 2017–present 
Massé, along with activist Gabriel Nadeau-Dubois, was elected co-spokesperson for Québec solidaire at the party's conference in May 2017. This is a continuation the party's tradition of allocating the role to a woman and a man to serve concurrently.

In her role, she was proposed by the party as their candidate for Premier of Quebec in the 2018 Quebec general election. In this election, the party tripled its seat count from three members to ten, the party's best performance to date and bringing the party to third party status, ahead of the traditional major sovereigntist party, Parti Québécois.

In the trial of Catalonia independence leaders she testified at the Supreme Court of Spain on 29 April 2019 due to her role as international observer in the 2017 Catalan independence referendum.

Electoral District

Personal life 
Massé is a noted feminist and social justice activist in and around Montreal. She is an out lesbian and partner to Ghislaine Goulet.

References

1963 births
21st-century Canadian politicians
21st-century Canadian women politicians
Activists from Montreal
Canadian LGBT people in provincial and territorial legislatures
Canadian women activists
Canadian anti-poverty activists
Lesbian politicians
Living people
People from Windsor, Quebec
Politicians from Montreal
Québec solidaire MNAs
Women MNAs in Quebec
Université de Montréal alumni
21st-century Canadian LGBT people